The Ireland men's national under-20 basketball team is a national basketball team of Ireland, administered by the Basketball Ireland. It represents the country in international men's under-20 basketball competitions.

FIBA U20 European Championship participations

See also
Ireland men's national basketball team
Ireland men's national under-18 basketball team
Ireland women's national under-20 basketball team

References

External links
Archived records of Ireland team participations

Basketball in Ireland
Basketball
Men's national under-20 basketball teams